−

The Men's pentathlon 2 was one of the events held in athletics at the 1972 Summer Paralympics in Heidelberg.

There were five competitors in the event.

Josef Jager of Austria won the gold medal.

Results

Final

References 

Pentathlon